The Ohio Department of Agriculture (ODA) is the administrative department of the Ohio state government responsible for ensuring the safety of the food supply, to maintain the health of animals and plant life, to create economic opportunities for farmers, food processors and agribusinesses, and to inspect amusement park rides in the state of Ohio.

History

Already rumoured in 2008 and initiated in 2009, the ODA was sued by the International Dairy Foods Association, which "is a trade organization whose collective membership consists of an estimated 85 percent of the milk, cultured-products, cheese, and frozen-desserts producers in the United States" to overturn a "regulation designed to curb the allegedly misleading labeling of dairy products" which were produced by cows injected with "genetically engineered hormone called recombinant bovine somatotropin (rBST), also known as recombinant bovine growth hormone (rBGH)." The head of the ODA at the time was Robert Boggs. The ODA finally in September 2010 lost the case in the Sixth Circuit Court of Appeals and the "allegedly misleading labeling" was allowed to continue unabated. A professor in the Department of Nutrition, Food Studies, and Public Health at New York University named Marion Nestle wrote in The Atlantic with questions about Ohio's will to regulate and whether it planned to settle the matter in the United States Supreme Court.

References

External links
Official website

Agriculture
Ohio
Agriculture in Ohio